Norman Harold Lever, Baron Lever of Manchester, PC (15 January 19146 August 1995) was a British barrister and Labour Party politician.

Early life
He was born in Manchester, the son of a Jewish textile merchant from Lithuania, and was educated at Manchester Grammar School and Manchester University.  He was called to the Bar of the Middle Temple in 1935. During World War II he served in the Royal Air Force. His brother was Leslie Lever, Baron Lever.

Career
Lever was elected Member of Parliament for Manchester Exchange at the 1945 general election, then Manchester, Cheetham from 1950 to 1974. His brother, Leslie Lever, was elected MP for the neighbouring Manchester Ardwick seat. He promoted the Private Member's Bill that became the Defamation Act 1952.

He was Joint Parliamentary Under-Secretary of State for Economic Affairs in 1967; Financial Secretary to the Treasury, September 1967–69; Paymaster General, 1969–70, a Member of the Shadow Cabinet from 1970 to 1974 and Chairman of the Public Accounts Committee, 1970–73. His seat changed again, becoming Manchester Central from 1974 to 1979.  On Labour's return to power after the February 1974 general election, he was Chancellor of the Duchy of Lancaster from 1974 to 1979.

Lever held a number of business appointments in the banking and journalism sectors. He was Governor of the London School of Economics from 1971, and of the English Speaking Union 1973–86. He was a Trustee of the Royal Opera House from 1974 to 1982, and a Member of the Court of Manchester University from 1975 to 1987. He was an Honorary Fellow, and Chairman of the Trustees of the Royal Academy from 1981 to 1987. He held Honorary doctorates in Law, Science, Literature and Technology and was awarded the Grand Cross, Order of Merit, Germany, 1979.

He was appointed a Privy Counsellor in 1969 and created a life peer as Baron Lever of Manchester, of Cheetham in the City of Manchester on 3 July 1979. As a Peer and elder statesman he successfully arbitrated the 1980 Steel Strike, one of the UK's longest industrial disputes. In 1983 he served on the Franks Committee, a committee of inquiry by six Privy Counsellors into the Falklands War. In 1984 he was Chairman of the Commonwealth Prime Ministers' commission into the Developing World Debt Crisis. The following year, 1985 he co-wrote "Debt and Danger" which advocated excusing the Developing World a debt burden which was crippling their fragile economies.

Personal life
His first marriage was in 1939, to a medical student, Ethel Sebrinski (née Samuel), which ended in "a friendly divorce".

In 1945, he married Betty "Billie" Featherman (née Wolfe), and they had one daughter, but Betty died of leukemia shortly after the birth.

His third wife was Mrs Diane Zilkha (née Bashi), the ex-wife of Selim Zilkha, and they married at the Westminster Synagogue on 15 March 1962. They had three daughters. They were married for over 30 years until his death on 6 August 1995, and lived in a 22-roomed apartment in Eaton Square, which Diane "converted ... into a palace".

He was a strong bridge player, who represented both the House of Commons and the House of Lords in their annual match. The side he played for usually won.

Death and legacy
He died in August 1995, aged 81.

His policy was adopted by the G7 in 2005, a decade after his death.

References

External links 
 

|-

|-

|-

|-

1914 births
1995 deaths
Alumni of the University of Manchester
British Secretaries of State
Chancellors of the Duchy of Lancaster
English Jews
Grand Crosses 1st class of the Order of Merit of the Federal Republic of Germany
Jewish British politicians
Labour Party (UK) MPs for English constituencies
Labour Party (UK) life peers
Members of the Privy Council of the United Kingdom
Ministers in the Wilson governments, 1964–1970
People associated with the London School of Economics
People educated at Manchester Grammar School
Politicians from Manchester
Royal Air Force personnel of World War II
UK MPs 1945–1950
UK MPs 1950–1951
UK MPs 1951–1955
UK MPs 1955–1959
UK MPs 1959–1964
UK MPs 1964–1966
UK MPs 1966–1970
UK MPs 1970–1974
UK MPs 1974
UK MPs 1974–1979
UK MPs 1979–1983
United Kingdom Paymasters General
Life peers created by Elizabeth II